Bob Funk Sr. (born 1940 in Duvall, Washington) is the co-founder and president, as well as a board member, of Express Employment Professionals, an employment agency company headquartered in Oklahoma City.  He owns various enterprises, including sports teams, through his Express subsidiaries and is a philanthropist who sits on the governing boards of several organizations.  He also served as chairman of the Federal Reserve Bank in Kansas City.

Early life
Before founding Express Employment Professionals in 1983, Funk was a personnel consultant (1965) and vice president (1975) at ACME Personnel Services.  He is an alum of both Seattle Pacific University and the University of Edinburgh (Scotland). As a boy, Funk was interested in farming, entrepreneurship, and religion, even spending six months studying in a seminary in Scotland.

Career
Funk is the Co-founder of, President, and Board Member of Express Employment Professionals, an employment agency company headquartered in Oklahoma City that has been cited for dozens of serious safety violations and wage infractions.  He owns various enterprises, including sports teams, through his Express subsidiaries and is a philanthropist who sits on the governing boards of several organizations.  He served as the chairman of the Federal Reserve Bank in Kansas City.

Patron of the arts

As a hobby, Funk enjoys elk hunting and is a patron of the arts. While on a hunting trip in 1989 at Taylor Ranch in Colorado, Funk met the Montana sculptor Daniel Parker. After Funk discovered that Parker was a wildlife artist, he asked if he had any examples of his work to show him.  It just so happened that Parker had an elk bust sculpture called Perfection in his truck and, after showing it to Funk, a sale was consummated on the spot for the sculpture.  Parker would meet Funk again at the C. M. Russell Art Show in 1999 and some years later he suggested to Funk that he could design a sculpture of a Clydesdale horse to be given as an award to exemplary employees of Funk's Express Employment Professionals company in Oklahoma City.  A deal was struck between the two that resulted in Parker casting a 50-piece edition called Express Ranch Clydesdale. Over time, Funk has added several more Parker sculptures to his collection, including a monumental bronze elk sculpture for the entrance to his ranch.

Funk, who is a major donor to the western town exhibit called "Prosperity Junction" at the National Cowboy & Western Heritage Museum in Oklahoma City, said he hopes that the authentic late 19th century exhibit will help give something back to the community while giving the rest of the country a taste of the American West.

Public policy and political polling
Express Employment Professionals also conducts polling on public policy issues and political candidates.

References

Living people
American businesspeople
Seattle Pacific University alumni
1940 births